Nehemiah 10 is the tenth chapter of the Book of Nehemiah in the Old Testament of the Christian Bible, or the 20th chapter of the book of Ezra-Nehemiah in the Hebrew Bible, which treats the book of Ezra and the book of Nehemiah as one book. Jewish tradition states that Ezra is the author of Ezra-Nehemiah as well as the Book of Chronicles, but modern scholars generally accept that a compiler from the 5th century BCE (the so-called "Chronicler") is the final author of these books. The chapter contains the list of signatories to the people's pledge and the later part deals with intermarriage with the non-Jews among the “people of the land” (parallel to Ezra 10) punctuated with the pledge to separate from “foreigners”.

Text
The original text of this chapter is in  Hebrew language. In English Bible texts this chapter is divided into 39 verses, but 40 verses in Hebrew Bible, due to a different verse numbering as follows:

This article generally follows the common numbering in Christian English Bible versions, with notes to the numbering in Hebrew Bible versions.

Textual witnesses
Some early manuscripts containing the text of this chapter in Hebrew are of the Masoretic Text, which includes Codex Leningradensis (1008).

There is also a translation into Koine Greek known as the Septuagint, made in the last few centuries BCE. Extant ancient manuscripts of the Septuagint version include Codex Vaticanus (B; B; 4th century), Codex Sinaiticus (S; BHK: S; 4th century), and Codex Alexandrinus (A; A; 5th century).

The leaders set their seal to the pledge (10:1–27)
After the first seal from Nehemiah the governor (verse 1a), the record is carefully ordered with three lists of signatories: the priests (10:1b–8), the Levites (10:9–13) and the chiefs of the people (10:14–27). Ezra the priest, who has played a leading part in the narrative on chapters 8 and 9, is not mentioned in this chapter.

Verse 1
Now those who placed their seal on the document were:
Nehemiah the governor, the son of Hacaliah, and Zedekiah,"Governor": Hebrew: Tirshatha. Nehemiah was the governor of Yehud Medinata, or the province of Judah, within the Persian Achaemenid Empire.

Verse 3Pashhur, Amariah, Malchijah,"Malchijah": the name of the fifth of "24 Priestly Divisions" in 1 Chronicles 24. This name appears in a stone inscription that was found in 1970 on a partially buried column in a mosque, in the Yemeni village of Bayt al-Ḥaḍir, among the ten names of priestly wards and their respective towns and villages. This "Yemeni inscription" is the longest roster of names of this sort ever discovered, unto this day. The names legible on the stone column discovered by Walter W. Müller.

Verse 5Harim, Meremoth, Obadiah,"Harim": the name of the third of "24 Priestly Divisions" in 1 Chronicles 24 (cf. Nehemiah 12:15, possibly “Rehum" in Nehemiah 12:3). One fragment of Dead Sea Scrolls (4Q325; "Mishmarot D") mentions:The beginning of the se[cond] month is [on the si]xth [day] of the course of Jedaiah. On the second of the month is the Sabbath of the course of Harim....

Verse 7Meshullam, Abijah, Mijamin,"Abijah": the name of the eighth of "24 Priestly Divisions" in 1 Chronicles 24 (cf. Nehemiah 12:4, 17). Zechariah, the father of John the Baptist, was a member of this division (Luke 1:5; also spelled as "Abia"). This name appears in the "Yemeni inscription", found in 1970 in the Yemeni village of Bayt al-Ḥaḍir, among the ten names of priestly wards and their respective towns and villages (cf. verse 3 "Malchijah").
This name appears in the "Yemeni inscription", found in 1970 in the Yemeni village of Bayt al-Ḥaḍir, among the ten names of priestly wards and their respective towns and villages (cf. verse 3 "Malchijah"). It is spelled as "Minjamin" in Nehemiah 12:17.

Verse 8Maaziah, Bilgai, Shemaiah: these were the priests."Maaziah": The name of the twenty-fourth of "24 Priestly Divisions" in 1 Chronicles 24 (probably “Maadiah” in Nehemiah 12:5).
"Bilgai": spelled as "Bilgah" in Nehemiah 12:5; the name of the fifteenth of "24 Priestly Divisions" in 1 Chronicles 24.

Stipulations of the pledge (10:28–39)
The pledge contains the general affirmation involving the whole community (verses 28–29; cf. Ezra 9–10) and particular obligations 'which they lay upon themselves' (verses 30–39), in relation to intermarriage (verse 30), to the Sabbath and sabbatical year (verse 31), and to the provision for the upkeep of the Temple and clergy (verses 32–). The wording can be traced to the Book of Deuteronomy, such as "to walk in God's law" (cf. ) and "to observe and do all the commandments" (cf. ). 

Verse 32Also we made ordinances for us, to charge ourselves yearly with the third part of a shekel for the service of the house of our God;"Made ordinances for us": Hebrew "cause to stand on us," NET Bible: "accept responsibility for fulfilling the commands".
"To charge ourselves": Hebrew MT reads "to give upon us", but the term  (ʿalenu'', "upon us") is not found in a few medieval Hebrew mss, the Syriac Peshitta, and the Vulgate; NET Bible: "to give".
"Shekel": was about 2/5 ounce or 11 grams.
"House" (as in Hebrew): refers to the "temple" (also in ).

See also
Jerusalem
Tithe
Related Bible parts: Deuteronomy 28, Ezra 9, Ezra 10

Notes

References

Sources

Further reading
Blenkinsopp, Joseph, "Ezra-Nehemiah: A Commentary" (Eerdmans, 1988)
Blenkinsopp, Joseph, "Judaism, the first phase" (Eerdmans, 2009)
Coggins, R.J., "The Books of Ezra and Nehemiah" (Cambridge University Press, 1976)
Ecker, Ronald L., "Ezra and Nehemiah", Ecker's Biblical Web Pages, 2007.
Grabbe, L.L., "Ezra-Nehemiah" (Routledge, 1998)
Grabbe, L.L., "A history of the Jews and Judaism in the Second Temple Period, Volume 1" (T&T Clark, 2004)

External links
 Jewish translations:
 Nechemiah - Nehemiah - Chapter 10 (Judaica Press) translation [with Rashi's commentary] at Chabad.org
 Christian translations:
 Online Bible at GospelHall.org (ESV, KJV, Darby, American Standard Version, Bible in Basic English)
 Book of Nehemiah Chapter 10. Bible Gateway

10